Hill Air Force Base  is a major U.S. Air Force (USAF) base located in Davis County, Utah, just south of the city of Ogden, and bordering the Cities of Layton, Clearfield, Riverdale, Roy, and Sunset with its largest border immediately adjacent to Clearfield and Layton. The base was named in honor of Major Ployer Peter Hill of the U.S. Army Air Corps, who died test-flying NX13372, the original Model 299 prototype of the B-17 Flying Fortress bomber. As of 2018 Hill AFB is the sixth-largest employer in the state of Utah.
Hill AFB is the home of the Air Force Materiel Command's (AFMC) Ogden Air Logistics Complex (OO-ALC) which is the worldwide manager for a wide range of aircraft, engines, missiles, software, avionics, and accessories components.  The OO-ALC is part of the Air Force Sustainment Center.

The host unit at Hill AFB is the AFMC's 75th Air Base Wing (75 ABW), which provides services and support for the OO-ALC and its subordinate organizations. Additional tenant units at Hill AFB include operational fighter wings of Air Combat Command (ACC) and Air Force Reserve Command (AFRC).

History
Hill Air Force Base is named in honor of Major Ployer Peter Hill (1894–1935), the Chief of the Flying Branch of the U.S. Army Air Corps (USAAC) Material Division of Wright Field, Dayton, Ohio. Major Hill had died as a result of injuries he received from the crash of the Boeing Aircraft Company's experimental aircraft Boeing Model 299 at Wright Field, the prototype airplane for what became the famous B-17 Flying Fortress.

Hill Air Force Base traces its origins back to the ill-fated U.S. Army's Air Mail "experiment" of 1934, when the idea originated for a permanent air depot in the Salt Lake City area. In the following years, the USAAC surveyed the region for a suitable location for the permanent western terminus of the air mail. Several sites in Utah were considered, and the present site near Ogden emerged as the clear favorite.

In July 1939, Congress appropriated $8.0 million for the establishment and construction of the Ogden Air Depot. Hill Field officially opened on 7 November 1940.

Following American entry into World War II in December 1941, Hill Field quickly became an important maintenance and supply base, with round-the-clock operations geared to supporting the war effort. Battle-worn warplanes like the A-26, B-17, B-24, B-29, P-40, P-47, P-61, were sent to Hill Field for structural repairs, engine overhauls, and spare parts. The peak wartime employment at Hill Field was reached in 1943 with a total of just over 22,000 military and civilian personnel. Men and women at the depot rehabilitated and returned thousands of warplanes to combat.

Starting in 1944, Hill Field was utilized for the long-term storage of surplus airplanes and their support equipment, including outmoded P-40 Tomahawks and P-40 Warhawks which had been removed from combat service and replaced by newer and better warplanes. P-47 Thunderbolts, B-24 Liberators, B-29 Superfortresses, and many other types of aircraft were also prepared for and placed in storage at Hill over the course of the 1940s and 1950s.

Hill Field became the Hill Air Force Base on 5 February 1948, following the creation of the United States Air Force. During the Korean War, Hill AFB was assigned a major share of the Air Materiel Command's logistical effort to support the combat in Korea. Hill AFB personnel quickly removed needed warplanes from storage, renovated them, and added them to active-service USAF flying squadrons.

Then during the 1960s, Hill AFB began to perform the maintenance support for various kinds of jet warplanes, mainly the F-4 Phantom II during the Vietnam War, and then afterwards, the more modern F-16 Fighting Falcon, A-10 Thunderbolt II and C-130 Hercules, and also air combat missile systems and air-to-ground rockets. Hill AFB continues to carry out these tasks to the present day.

Major commands assigned

 Materiel Div, Office of Chief of the Air Corps, 1 December 1939 – 11 December 1941
Air Service Command, 11 December 1941 – 17 July 1944
 AAF Materiel and Services, 17 July 1944 – 31 August 1944
Army Air Forces Technical Service Command, 31 August 1944 – 1 July 1945
Air Technical Service Command, 1 July 1945 – 9 March 1946
Air Materiel Command, 9 March 1946 – 1 April 1961
Air Force Logistics Command, 1 April 1961 – 1 June 1992
Air Force Materiel Command 1 June 1992 – present

Base operating units

 Ogden Air Depot, 7 November 1940 – 8 April 1942
 9th Station Complement, 8 April 1942 – 2 January 1943
 482d Base HQ and Air Base Sq, 2 January 1943 – 1 April 1944
 4135th AAF Base Unit, 1 April 1944 – 26 September 1947
 4135th AF Base Unit, 26 September 1947 – 27 August 1948
 HQ and HQ Sq, Ogden AMA, 27 August 1948 – 4 May 1950
 25th Air Base Gp, 4 May 1950 – 1 May 1953
 2849th Air Base Wg, 1 May 1953 – 8 July 1964
 2849th Air Base Gp, 8 July 1964 – 1994
 75th Air Base Wing 1994 – present

Role and operations

Ogden Air Logistics Complex 
The Ogden Air Logistics Complex provides worldwide engineering and logistics management for the F-35 Lightning II, F-16 Fighting Falcon, A-10 Thunderbolt II, and Minuteman III intercontinental ballistic missile.

75th Air Base Wing 
The 75th Air Base Wing is responsible for the base operating support of all units at Hill AFB. The 75th ABW provides base operating support for the Ogden Air Logistics Complex, the 388th and 419th Fighter Wings, and 50+ mission partner units.

Hill Aerospace Museum 
Hill AFB has also housed the  Hill Aerospace Museum since 1981. This contains more than 80 retired USAF, U.S. Army Air Forces, U.S. Navy and former Warsaw Pact fixed-wing aircraft, helicopters, and missiles.

Utah Test and Training Range
The Utah Test and Training Range is one of the only live-fire U.S. Air Force training ranges within the United States. It is located in far western Utah, close to the Nevada border, and it extends both north and south of Interstate Highway 80, with several miles of separation on each side of the Interstate Highway. The portion of the bombing range that lies north of Interstate 80 is also west of the Great Salt Lake.  The Utah Test and Training Range lies in Tooele County, and the land is owned by the state of Utah, but the use of the airspace and training exercises are scheduled by Hill AFB.

On September 8, 2004, the National Aeronautics and Space Administration's Genesis space probe crash-landed on the nearby U.S. Army Dugway Proving Ground, as planned.

Based units 
Flying and notable non-flying units based at Hill Air Force Base.

Units marked GSU are Geographically Separate Units, which although based at Hill, are subordinate to a parent unit based at another location.

United States Air Force 

Air Force Materiel Command (AFMC)

 75th Air Base Wing (Host wing)
 75th Civil Engineering Directorate
 75th Communications and Information Directorate
 75th Medical Group
 75th Mission Support Group
 Air Force Sustainment Center
 Ogden Air Logistics Complex
 309th Aircraft Maintenance Group
 309th Commodities Maintenance Group
 309th Electronics Maintenance Group
 309th Maintenance Support Group
 309th Missile Maintenance Group
 309th Software Engineering Group
 448th Supply Chain Management Wing
 748th Supply Chain Management Group (GSU)
 414th Supply Chain Management Squadron
 415th Supply Chain Management Squadron
 416th Supply Chain Management Squadron
 417th Supply Chain Management Squadron
 419th Supply Chain Management Squadron
 Air Force Life Cycle Management Center
 Fighters/Bombers Directorate
 A-10 Division (GSU)
 F-16 Division (GSU) 
 F-22 Division (GSU)
 F-35 operating location (GSU)
 Armament Directorate
 Munitions Division (GSU)
 Battle Management Directorate
 Aerospace Enabler Division (GSU)
 Mobility Directorate
 Mature and Proven Aircraft Division (GSU)
 Logistics Directorate
 Product Data Services Division (GSU)
 Agile Combat Support Directorate
 Automatic Test Systems Division (GSU)
 Air Force Nuclear Weapons Center
 ICBM Systems Directorate (GSU)

Air Combat Command (ACC)

 Fifteenth Air Force
 388th Fighter Wing
 388th Operations Group
 4th Fighter Squadron – F-35A Lightning II
 34th Fighter Squadron – F-35A Lightning II
 388th Operations Support Squadron
 421st Fighter Squadron F-35A Lightning II
 729th Air Control Squadron
 388th Maintenance Group
 388th Aircraft Maintenance Squadron
 388th Maintenance Squadron
 Headquarters Utah Test and Training Range

Air Force Reserve Command (AFRC)

 419th Fighter Wing
 419th Operations Group
 466th Fighter Squadron – F-35A Lightning II 
 419th Maintenance Group
 419th Maintenance Squadron
 419th Aircraft Maintenance Squadron
 419th Maintenance Operations Flight
 419th Combat Logistics Support Squadron 
 419th Mission Support Group
 419th Security Forces Squadron
 419th Civil Engineer Squadron
 419th Mission Support Flight
 419th Logistics Readiness Squadron
 67th Aerial Port Squadron

Connections to the Hi-Fi murders
Three enlisted United States Air Force airmen stationed at Hill AFB – Pierre Dale Selby, William Andrews and Keith Roberts – were convicted in connection with the Hi-Fi murders, which took place at the Hi-Fi Shop in Ogden, Utah, on April 22, 1974. Selby and Andrews were both sentenced to death for murder and aggravated robbery while Roberts, who had remained in a getaway vehicle, was convicted of robbery.  Evidence gathered from a trashbin on base and from the perpetrators' barracks was instrumental in their convictions.

One of the survivors of the attack, Cortney Naisbitt, later trained in computers and worked at Hill Air Force Base.

Accidents and Incidents
October 19, 2022: An Lockheed Martin F-35 Lightning II crashed off the end of runway 14. The 388th Fighter Wing has stated that the solo pilot was seen by a local hospital and released with no injuries.

See also
 List of Historic American Engineering Record (HAER) documentation of Hill AFB 
 List of United States Air Force installations
Utah World War II Army Airfields

References 

Note: Much of this text in an early version of this article was taken from pages on the Hill Air Force Base Website, which as a work of the U.S. Government is presumed to be a public domain resource.  That information was supplemented by:
 Mueller, Robert (1989). Active Air Force Bases Within the United States of America on 17 September 1982. USAF Reference Series, Maxwell AFB, Alabama: Office of Air Force History. 
 Ravenstein, Charles A. (1984). Air Force Combat Wings Lineage and Honors Histories 1947–1977. Maxwell AFB, Alabama: Office of Air Force History. .

External links

 
 
 

1939 establishments in Utah
Military airbases established in 1939
Airports in Utah
Buildings and structures in Davis County, Utah
Buildings and structures in Weber County, Utah
Military installations in Utah
Post-World War II aircraft storage facilities
Installations of the United States Air Force
Military Superfund sites
Airfields of the United States Army Air Forces Technical Service Command
Transportation in Davis County, Utah
Transportation in Weber County, Utah
Superfund sites in Utah
Historic American Engineering Record in Utah
World War II airfields in the United States